Richard Cabral (born August 28, 1984) is an American actor, occasional producer and writer. He is best known for his roles on Mayans M.C. on FX, the ABC television series American Crime, which earned him a Primetime Emmy Award nomination in 2015, and the Fox television series Lethal Weapon.

Early life 
Cabral grew up in East Los Angeles, in a second-generation Mexican-American family. He became active in gang activity from an early age. He said in an interview with Entertainment Tonight that his family had been a part of the gang scene since the 1990s. He was a documented member of Varrio 213 in Montebello (East Los Angeles), California. When he was a child, he was separated from his family. He was incarcerated at the age of 13 for stealing a wallet. Cabral developed an addiction to crack cocaine by the age of 15. He obtained his GED as a teenager but once again got in trouble with the law. He was sentenced to prison for violent assault with a deadly weapon (shooting), and was released at the age of 25.

Career 
Cabral's entertainment career started in the Chicano Rap music scene as a member of the chicano rap group "Charlie Row Campo". He created several albums and features under the moniker "Baby Jokes", or "Joker". The music mostly depicted negative, gang-related street tales.

While Cabral was trying to turn his life around, his friends recommended he seek out the services of Homeboy Industries, a gang-intervention program based in Los Angeles. There he auditioned and landed his first role, which led him to further his skills through acting classes and seminars. In 2009, he began to act, with Cabral appearing in the television show Southland. In 2010, he appeared in the music video for Bruno Mars' single "Grenade".

In 2015, Cabral starred in the mini-series American Crime, in which he portrayed the character Hector Tontz. For his role, Cabral was nominated for Outstanding Supporting Actor in a Limited Series or a Movie at the 2015 Primetime Emmy Awards.

In 2016, Cabral co-wrote with Robert Egan a one-man show called Fighting Shadows, about his experiences as a former gang member who spent years in and out of prison.

Awards

In 2013, Cabral won the Lo Maximo award from Homeboy Industries, which honors HI service recipients who give back to the community.

Filmography

Film

Television

Music Videos

Awards and nominations

References

External links 
 

American male television actors
Male actors from Los Angeles
Living people
Writers from Los Angeles
21st-century American writers
American male writers
American male actors of Mexican descent
1984 births
People from Montebello, California